(R)-oxynitrilase may refer to:
 Aliphatic (R)-hydroxynitrile lyase, an enzyme
 Mandelonitrile lyase, an enzyme